Thomas Sprigg (1747 – December 13, 1809) was an 18th-century American politician. He represented the fourth district of Maryland in the United States House of Representatives from 1793 to 1797.

Sprigg was born in Prince George's County, Maryland.  He served during the American Revolutionary War as ensign in the Maryland Battalion of the Flying Camp from September to December 1776.  He was appointed the first register of wills of Washington County, Maryland, in 1777, and served until September 29, 1780, when he resigned. He was a delegate to the Maryland State Convention of 1788, to vote whether Maryland should ratify the proposed Constitution of the United States. He was appointed lieutenant of Washington County by the governor and Council of Maryland on December 21, 1779.

Sprigg was elected as an Anti-Administration candidate to the Third Congress and reelected as a Democratic-Republican to the Fourth Congress, serving from March 4, 1793, to March 3, 1797.  He died in Washington County.

Sprigg was an uncle of Richard Sprigg, Jr., another Congressman.

References

1747 births
1809 deaths
Members of the Maryland House of Delegates
Maryland militiamen in the American Revolution
People from Prince George's County, Maryland
Democratic-Republican Party members of the United States House of Representatives from Maryland
Sprigg family